Frankie Vaughan  (born Frank Fruim Abelson; 3 February 1928 – 17 September 1999) was an English singer and actor who recorded more than 80 easy listening and traditional pop singles in his lifetime. He was known as "Mr. Moonlight" after his signature song "Give Me the Moonlight, Give Me the Girl". Two of Vaughan's singles topped the UK Singles Chart – "The Garden of Eden" (1957) and "Tower of Strength" (1961). He starred in several films, including a role opposite Marilyn Monroe in Let's Make Love (1960).

Life and career

Vaughan was born Frank Fruim Abelson on Devon Street in the Islington district of Liverpool on 3 February 1928, one of four children of Isaac and Leah Abelson.

He came from a family of Russian Jewish descent, and derived his stage surname from his grandmother; as he was her first-born grandson, she called him "Frank my 'number one' grandson", and her Russian accent made "one" sound like "Vaughan". In his early life, he was a member of the Lancaster Lads' Club, a member group of the National Association of Boys' Clubs; having started out at the club intending to become a boxer, he was a major contributor to them during his career, dedicating his monetary compensation from one song each year to them. He was an evacuee during World War II.

He attended the Lancaster College of Art on a scholarship and was a vocalist in their dance band.  After a stint in the Royal Army Medical Corps (where he spent most of his time boxing) he returned to art school, this time at the Leeds College of Art.  An early appearance was in the Leeds students rag revue “It’s Rag Time” which opened on June 20, 1949 at the Empire Theatre in Leeds when he was described as the show’s main vocalist. He was still known as Frank Abelson at that time. When he won a prize in a design contest, he left for London, where he won second prize on a radio talent show. He auditioned for the agent Billy Marsh who quickly booked him in for a week at the Kingston Empire in May 1950 with Jimmy Wheeler. His debut went well with press comment stating "Frankie Vaughan gives a promising performance when singing some new and old songs in a crooning style. He receives a warm reception." This led to further bookings on the variety circuit and he appeared with the veteran male impersonator Hetty King on several occasions. Her guidance helped change Vaughan's style for the rest of his career. He became known as a fancy dresser, wearing top hat, bow tie, tails, and cane.  

Vaughan made his first television appearance on October 13, 1951 in a variety show from the Theatre Royal, Leeds starring Gracie Fields. He was introduced by Donald Peers and sang "Lucky Me". 

He made his first records in 1950 for His Master's Voice but they were not popular. In August 1952 he joined the dance band of Nat Temple for a year or so, but the popularity of further recordings he made in 1953 encouraged him to return to the variety stage.  He switched to the Philips label and in 1955, he recorded what was to become his trademark song, "Give Me the Moonlight, Give Me the Girl".

He recorded a large number of songs that were covers of United States hit songs, including Perry Como's "Kewpie Doll", Jimmie Rodgers' "Kisses Sweeter than Wine", Boyd Bennett's "Seventeen" (also covered in the US by the Fontane Sisters), Jim Lowe's "The Green Door", and (with the Kaye Sisters), the Fleetwoods' "Come Softly to Me". In 1956, his cover of "The Green Door" reached No. 2 in the UK Singles Chart. The same year he was voted 'Showbusiness Personality of the Year'. In early 1957, his version of "The Garden of Eden", reached No. 1 in the UK Singles Chart. In 1957 he was voted the eighth most popular star at the British box office.

Managed at this time by former journalist and theatrical agent Paul Cave, Vaughan stayed in the United States for a time to make a film with Marilyn Monroe, Let's Make Love (1960), and was an actor in several other films, but his recordings were never chart hits in the US, with the exception of "Judy", which reached No.100 on the Billboard Hot 100 in August 1958. In 1961, Vaughan was on the bill at the Royal Variety Performance at the Prince of Wales Theatre, Coventry Street, London. That December, Vaughan hit No. 1 in the UK again, with "Tower of Strength", written by Burt Bacharach and Bob Hilliard. The rise of beat music eclipsed Vaughan's chart career before he returned to the Top 10 in 1967 with "There Must Be a Way". Chart success eluded him after this although he did have two more Top 40 singles; "Nevertheless" and "So Tired".

In the late 1960s, Vaughan, involved himself with a youth project in Easterhouse, Glasgow. He was appalled by the level of violence amongst young people. Vaughan held meetings with the gang leaders and appealed for them to surrender their weapons.

In 1985, Vaughan starred in a stage version of 42nd Street at Drury Lane in London, opposite his old friend Shani Wallis who appeared in their first film together, Ramsbottom Rides Again. After a year, he nearly died of peritonitis and had to leave the cast. Vaughan was married to Leeds-born Stella Shock (1924–2022) from 1951 until his death; the couple had three children,  a daughter Susan (b.1963) and two sons, singer and yoga elder David Sye (b.1961) and actor-singer Andrew Abelson (b.1968).

In 1994, he was one of a few to be honoured by a second appearance on This Is Your Life, when he was surprised by Michael Aspel. Vaughan had been a subject of the show previously in April 1970 when Eamonn Andrews surprised him at the Caesar's Palace nightclub in Luton.

Despite frequent bouts of ill-health, Vaughan continued performing until shortly before his death from heart failure in 1999.

Awards and honours
Vaughan was awarded an OBE in 1965, a CBE in 1996, and as a long-time resident of High Wycombe had been a Deputy Lieutenant of Buckinghamshire since 1993. He was an Honorary Fellow of Liverpool John Moores University. He also received the Variety Club of Great Britain Award for "Showbusiness Personality of the Year" in 1957.

Death
Vaughan died from heart failure at his home in High Wycombe aged 71. His wife Stella donated archival materials, including scores and sheet music he had collected throughout his career to Liverpool John Moores University in 2000.

Discography

Filmography
 Ramsbottom Rides Again (1956) as Elmer
 These Dangerous Years (1957) as Dave Wyman
 Wonderful Things! (1958) as Carmello
 The Lady Is a Square (1959) as Johnny Burns
 The Heart of a Man (1959) as Frankie Martin
 Let's Make Love (1960) as Tony Danton
 The Right Approach (1961) as Leo Mack (final acting role)
 It's All Over Town (1964) as himself
 Full Dress Affair (1966, Broadcast 23 May 1966 : penultimate episode of the television show Mrs Thursday, starring Kathleen Harrison)

See also
List of British Jewish entertainers
List of artists who reached number one on the UK Singles Chart
List of performers on Top of the Pops
List of Columbia Records artists
List of 1950s one-hit wonders in the United States
List of people from Merseyside

References

External links 

Discography on UK Artists site
BBC obituary
The Frankie Vaughan Archive at Liverpool John Moores University
Frankie Vaughan Discography at Discoogle
 Jewish Lives Project profile of Frankie Vaughan

1928 births
1999 deaths
Male actors from Liverpool
Commanders of the Order of the British Empire
Deputy Lieutenants of Buckinghamshire
English crooners
English Jews
English male singers
Jewish singers
English people of Russian-Jewish descent
Musicians from Liverpool
Traditional pop music singers
Columbia Graphophone Company artists
Pye Records artists
Alumni of Leeds Arts University
20th-century English male actors
20th-century English singers
20th-century British male singers
20th-century British Army personnel
Royal Army Medical Corps soldiers